phil&teds is a manufacturer of strollers and other baby care products that are sold worldwide.  The company is headquartered in Wellington, New Zealand.

Awards and recognition 
In 2015 phil&teds won a Red Dot design award for their ‘verve’ buggy and has also been nominated for other awards, including recognition from the internationally recognized Kind + Jugend Innovation Award and the American Chamber of Commerce - UPS Success & Innovation Awards.

References

External links
 Official Site 

Babycare
Baby products